The 1907 municipal election was held December 9, 1907, for the purpose of electing a mayor and five aldermen to sit on the Edmonton City Council, Alberta, Canada as well as five public school trustees and six separate school trustees.  There were also four proposed bylaws put to a vote of the electorate concurrently with the election.

Positions to be elected

There were eight aldermen on city council, but three of the positions were already filled: Cameron Anderson and Wilfrid Gariépy had been elected to two-year terms in 1906, and were still in office.  James Walker had also been elected to a two-year term, but resigned, and had been replaced by Daniel Fraser, who was also still in office.

Thomas Daly had been elected to a two-year term in 1906, but resigned and hadn't been replaced.  Accordingly, the fifth place aldermanic candidate in the 1907 election - Herman McInnis - was elected only to serve out the remaining year of Daly's term.

Mayoral nominations

The candidates for mayor were former mayor John Alexander McDougall and incumbent councillor Joseph Henri Picard.  McDougall was nominated by William Short, Arthur Cushing, J C Dowsett, W R West, A E Jackson, and J W Huff.  Picard was nominated by William Antrobus Griesbach, Thomas Bellamy, George Manuel, William Thomas Henry, W J Graves, T P Hobson, and G K Allen.

Campaign

The election showed some signs of nastiness, as an anonymous letter (signed by a Mr. "Graybrook") attacking mayoral candidate McDougall was published in the Edmonton Journal.  The letter accused McDougall of demanding an unfairly inflated price for land the city intended to buy from him, and of making pledges to reduce municipal taxes without being sufficiently familiar with the city's financial situation.  The letter's writer was eventually exposed as being incumbent mayor William Antrobus Griesbach, who was not seeking re-election but who was supporting McDougall's opponent, Picard.

Endorsements

The East End Ratepayers' Association endorsed George S. Armstrong, John Galbraith, William Clegg, and Isaac Lane for election as aldermen.  All four men had signed on to the association's platform, which included
 allowing non-property owners to vote in elections, although not on money bylaws;
 stricter supervision of the city's sanitary standards;
 more widely distributed and more easily understood city financial statements;
 allowing a majority of a district's residents to petition for improvements to the district, preventing non-residents from having a veto over such improvements;
 the insertion of a fair wage clause into all city contracts;
 opposition to inflation of assessment of property values; and
 public ownership of all utilities, except as otherwise decided by a popular vote.

Voter turnout

There were 1679 ballots cast in the 1907 municipal election.  The number of eligible voters is no longer available, but the Edmonton Bulletin noted on the day of the election that "both Mssrs. McDougall and Picard have excellent organizations, and almost every available vote is being brought in."  It further asserted that the city's two polling stations were inadequate, and that the new council should create additional polling stations.

Results

(bold indicates elected, italics indicate incumbent)

Mayor

John Alexander McDougall - 1217
Joseph Henri Picard - 437

Aldermen

Robert Manson - 783
George S. Armstrong - 774
Thomas Bellamy - 736
Robert Lee - 696
Herman McInnes - 674
E B Edwards - 565
William Clegg - 425
John Galbraith - 399
John Calhoun - 378
Isaac Lane - 372
Cornelius Gallagher - 302
H D Johnson - 51

Public school trustees

A Butchart, W D Ferris, H A Gray,  A E May, and Alex Taylor were elected.  Detailed results are no longer available.

Separate (Catholic) school trustees

Wilfrid Gariépy, E J Hart, Prosper-Edmond Lessard, Joseph Henri Picard,  S Schultz, and O Tessier were elected.  Detailed results are no longer available.

Bylaws

The following bylaws were voted on concurrently with the 1907 election:

Bylaw 153

A bylaw to authorize an agreement between the Municipality and American Oil Co.
For: 1,208
Against: 643

Bylaw 112

A bylaw to grant Cyrus S. Eaton and Matt E. Springer a special franchise.
For: 973
Against: 247

Bylaw 111

A bylaw to grant N.W. Gas and Co. a special franchise.
For: 325
Against: 670

Bylaw 105
A bylaw to raise the sum of $50,000 to be paid to City Hospital by way of a bonus.
For: 1,083
Against: 124

References

City of Edmonton: Edmonton Elections

1907-12
1907 elections in Canada
1907 in Alberta